Helmut Goebel was a male Austrian international table tennis player.

He won a gold medal at the 1936 World Table Tennis Championships in the team event. He then secured a silver medal at the 1937 World Table Tennis Championships in the men's doubles with Richard Bergmann. One year later he won another silver at the 1938 World Table Tennis Championships in the men's team event.

See also
 List of table tennis players
 List of World Table Tennis Championships medalists

References

Austrian male table tennis players
World Table Tennis Championships medalists